Paul Irons (born December 23, 1983) is a former American football tight end for Team Michigan of the All American Football League.  Irons previously played in the National Football League for the Cleveland Browns and in college for Florida State University.

Irons has several current and former NFL players as cousins and uncles.  These include Grant Irons, Gerald Irons, David Irons, Kenny Irons and another cousin Jarrett Irons was an All-American linebacker for the Michigan Wolverines football team.

Irons also volunteers as the Associate Director of Community Outreach for Abandon Productions.

References

External links
 Paul Irons at nfl.com
 Page at DatabaseFootball.com

1983 births
St. Augustine High School (New Orleans) alumni
African-American players of American football
American football tight ends
Cleveland Browns players
Florida State Seminoles football players
Living people
Players of American football from New Orleans
21st-century African-American sportspeople
20th-century African-American people
Irons family (American football)